The 1985 European Weightlifting Championships were held in Katowice, Poland from May 21 to May 26, 1985. This was the 64th edition of the event. There were 120 men in action from 22 nations.

Medal summary

Medal table
Ranking by Big (Total result) medals

References
Results (Chidlovski.net)
Панорама спортивного года 1985 / Сост. В. Л. Штейнбах — М.: Физкультура и спорт, 1986. 

European Weightlifting Championships
European Weightlifting Championships
European Weightlifting Championships
International weightlifting competitions hosted by Poland
Sports competitions in Katowice
May 1985 sports events in Europe
20th century in Katowice